Magapit–Santa Teresita Road (also known as Magapit-Mission Road) is a two-lane,  national secondary road in the Cagayan province of the Philippines. It serves as a bypass road starting from Magapit Interchange in Lal-lo and ends at Dugo–San Vicente Road in Barangay Mission, Santa Teresita, making a shorter travel time to the Cagayan Special Economic Zone. The Cagayan North International Airport is accessible through this road.

The entire road is designated as National Route 119 (N119) of the Philippine highway network.

References

Roads in Cagayan